SET News (SETN) is a 24-hour news channel of the Sanlih E-Television in Taiwan, launched in March 1998.

SET News and sister channel SET iNews are considered media outlets leaning towards the Pan-Green coalition.

SET News is available on YouTube with its DOG reading Sanlih LIVE Hsinwen. Since April 2022, this stream is available only outside Taiwan, a move also made by competitors EBC News and TVBS apparently because of dissatisfaction of the cable operators;  SET replaced it with a non-geoblocked stream of sister channel SET iNews labeled as Sanlih+ (三立+).

See also
SET iNews (sister channel launched as SET Finance in 2011)

References

External links
 SET News official website

1998 establishments in Taiwan
Television channels and stations established in 1998
24-hour television news channels in Taiwan
Television news in Taiwan
Sanlih E-Television